Provincial Road 305 (PR 305) is a provincial road in the Canadian province of Manitoba.

The road begins at the signal-controlled intersection of the Trans-Canada Highway (PTH 1) and Yellowhead Highway (PTH 16), west of Portage la Prairie.  At first, it heads south, crossing PTH 2 near St. Claude, and then turns east.  It passes through Brunkild before reaching PTH 75 at Ste. Agathe.  PR 305 crosses the Red River at Ste. Agathe and then continues east to its end at PTH 59 near Tourond in the Rural Municipality of Hanover.

It is mostly a gravel road, except between the Trans-Canada Highway and PTH 2, and between PTH 75 and PTH 59, where it is a paved, two-lane road.

PR 305 near Tourond was used as a filming location for the 2014 direct-to-video film Joy Ride 3.

External links
Official Manitoba Highway Map

References

305